Najamuddin Shah Mubarak Ābroo (1683-1733) was an Indian poet. He was born in Gwalior, the grandson of Muhammad Ghaus Gwaliori, and hailed from a family of mystics. Born during the reign of the Mughal Emperor Aurangzeb he died during the reign of the Mughal Emperor Muhammad Shah during whose time Urdu had become a common language and installed as the court language.

Ābroo made extensive use of īhām (pun) in his poetry and was influenced by Sanskrit language through Brajbhasha and Indianised Persian poetry. He was a disciple of Siraj-ud-Din Ali Khan Arzu of Agra.

References

Urdu-language poets from India
Muslim poets
18th-century Indian Muslims
Urdu-language writers from Mughal India
1683 births
1733 deaths
17th-century Urdu-language writers
18th-century Urdu-language writers
18th-century Indian poets
People from Gwalior
Poets from Madhya Pradesh